During the Russian Civil War, the Soviet government allowed a variety of small arms and bladed weapons. Afterwards, the government made immediate alterations for those on whom it did not rely. The government had made it a point to "arm the working people" in the Declaration of the Rights of Working and Exploited People in January 1918. The December decree of the CPC of 1918, "On the surrender of weapons", ordered people to surrender any firearms, swords, bayonets and bombs, regardless of the degree of serviceability. The penalty for not doing so was ten years' imprisonment. Members of the Communist Party were allowed to have a single weapon (a pistol or a rifle) and possession of the weapon was recorded in the party membership book. Stalin's ally Sergey Kirov was assassinated by Leonid Nikolaev in 1934; Nikolaev was given a Nagant revolver and presumably a gun permit by NKVD agent Vania Zaporozhets.

On December 12, 1924, the Central Executive Committee of the USSR promulgated its degree "On the procedure of production, trade, storage, use, keeping and carrying firearms, firearm ammunition, explosive projectiles and explosives", all weapons were classified and divided into categories. Now the weapons permitted for personal possession by ordinary citizens could only be smoothbore hunting shotguns. Other categories of weapons were only possessed by those who were assigned duties by the Soviet state; for all others, access to these weapons was restricted to within state-regulated shooting ranges. Illegal gun possession was severely punished. Since March 1933 the manufacture, possession, purchase, sale of firearms (except for smoothbore) hunting weapons without proper authorization was punishable by up to five years in prison. In 1935, the same penalty was imposed for possession of knives. During the Great Patriotic War, the civilian population had to hand over all personal hunting weapons to the Red Army for defence against the German invasion. The same was true for weapons left by retreating German invaders in the war. They were to be surrendered to Red Army troops, the NKVD or local Soviet authorities within 24 hours. Cases of stolen weapons were also brought to criminal justice.

After the death of Joseph Stalin in 1953, the USSR saw a small wave of liberalisations for civilian gun ownership. Soviet civilians were allowed to purchase smoothbore hunting shotguns again, even without mandatory submission of hunting licenses. However, this lasted for not more than six years. The buyer again had to pre-register in the Soviet Society of Hunters since 1959. With the introduction of the new Criminal Code in 1960, penalties were significantly reduced for illegal possession of firearms, down to a mandatory two years of imprisonment, while the possession of melee weapons was no longer prohibited in the Soviet Union. 

Fourteen years later, the punishment for illegal purchase, keeping and carrying of weapons was increased again to five years' imprisonment. However, unregistered rifles that were voluntarily surrendered were met without responsibility or punishment.

See also
Gun control in Russia

References

Sources
 
 

Soviet Union
Soviet law
Soviet Union